The Vienna Convention on Diplomatic Relations of 1961 is an international treaty that defines a framework for diplomatic relations between independent countries. Its aim is to facilitate "the development of friendly relations" among governments through a uniform set of practices and principles; most notably, it codifies the longstanding custom of diplomatic immunity, in which diplomatic missions are granted privileges that enable diplomats to perform their functions without fear of coercion or harassment by the host country. The Vienna Convention is a cornerstone of modern international relations and international law and is almost universally ratified and observed; it is considered one of the most successful legal instruments drafted under the United Nations.

History

Throughout the history of sovereign states, diplomats have enjoyed a special status. Their function to negotiate agreements between states demands certain special privileges. An envoy from another nation is traditionally treated as a guest, their communications with their home nation treated as confidential, and their freedom from coercion and subjugation by the host nation treated as essential.

The first attempt to codify diplomatic immunity into diplomatic law occurred with the Congress of Vienna in 1815. This was followed much later by the Convention regarding Diplomatic Officers (Havana, 1928).

The present treaty on the treatment of diplomats was the outcome of a draft by the International Law Commission. The treaty was adopted on 18 April 1961, by the United Nations Conference on Diplomatic Intercourse and Immunities held in Vienna, Austria, and first implemented on 24 April 1964. The same Conference also adopted the Optional Protocol concerning Acquisition of Nationality, the Optional Protocol concerning the Compulsory Settlement of Disputes, the Final Act and four resolutions annexed to that Act. One notable aspect which arose from the 1961 treaty was the establishment of the Holy See's diplomatic immunity status with other nations.

Two years later, the United Nations adopted a closely related treaty, the Vienna Convention on Consular Relations.

Summary of provisions

The Vienna Convention is an extensive document, containing 53 articles. The following is a basic overview of its key provisions.
 The host nation at any time and for any reason can declare a particular member of the diplomatic staff to be persona non grata. The sending state must recall this person within a reasonable period of time, or otherwise this person may lose their diplomatic immunity (Article 9).
 The premises of a diplomatic mission, diplomatic premiers are the houses of ambassadors and are inviolable and must not be entered by the host country except by permission of the head of the mission; likewise, the host country must never search the premises, may not seize its documents or property, and must protect the mission from intrusion or damage (Article 22). Article 30 extends this provision to the private residence of the diplomats.
 The archives and documents of a diplomatic mission are inviolable and shall not be seized or opened by the host government (Article 24).
 The host country must permit and protect free communication between the diplomats of the mission and their home country. A diplomatic bag must never be opened, even on suspicion of abuse, and a diplomatic courier must never be arrested or detained (Article 27).
 Diplomats must not be liable to any form of arrest or detention, and the receiving state must make all efforts to protect their person and dignity (Article 29).
 Diplomats are immune from the civil and criminal jurisdiction of the host state, with exceptions for professional activities outside the diplomat's official functions (Article 31). Article 32 permits sending states to waive this immunity.
 Diplomatic missions are exempt from taxes (Article 34) and customs duties (Article 36).
 Family members of diplomats living in the host country enjoy most of the same protections as the diplomats themselves (Article 37).

Optional protocols

The same year the treaty was adopted, two protocols were added as amendments; countries may ratify the main treaty without necessarily ratifying these optional agreements.

 Concerning acquisition of nationality. The head of the mission, the staff of the mission, and their families, shall not acquire the nationality of the receiving country.
 Concerning compulsory settlement of disputes. Disputes arising from the interpretation of this treaty may be brought before the International Court of Justice.
 Countries can choose to recognize their embassies as sovereign territory

States parties to the convention

, there are 193 state parties to the Vienna Convention, including all UN member states – with the exceptions of Palau and South Sudan – and the UN observer states of the Holy See and State of Palestine. The Republic of China signed and ratified the convention on 18 April 1961 and 19 December 1969, respectively, prior to the UN granting China's seat to the People's Republic of China. There are no states that have signed the treaty but not ratified it.

See also
 Diplomatic immunity
 Precedence among European monarchies
 Protection of Diplomats Convention
 Vienna Conventions for a list of other conventions
 Vienna Convention on Consular Relations (1963)
 Vienna Convention on the Law of Treaties (1969)
 Vienna Convention on the Law of Treaties between States and International Organizations or between International Organizations (1986)

References

Acta Universitatis Danubius. Relationes Internationales, Vol 9, No 1 (2016)

External links

Original text related to this article
Diplomatic Relations Protocols
The Vienna Convention on Diplomatic Relations 50th Anniversary Website Created by the 2011 VCDR 50th Anniversary Project
 Introductory note by Eileen Denza, procedural history note and audiovisual material on the Vienna Convention on Diplomatic Relations in the Historic Archives of the United Nations Audiovisual Library of International Law
 Lecture by Eileen Denza entitled Diplomatic and Consular Law – Topical Issues in the Lecture Series of the United Nations Audiovisual Library of International Law
 Lecture by John Dugard entitled Diplomatic Protection in the Lecture Series of the United Nations Audiovisual Library of International Law

Diplomatic immunity and protection treaties
Cold War treaties
Treaties drafted by the International Law Commission
Treaties concluded in 1961
Treaties entered into force in 1964
Treaties of the Kingdom of Afghanistan
Treaties of the People's Socialist Republic of Albania
Treaties of Algeria
Treaties of Andorra
Treaties of the People's Republic of Angola
Treaties of Argentina
Treaties of Armenia
Treaties of Australia
Treaties of Austria
Treaties of Azerbaijan
Treaties of the Bahamas
Treaties of Bahrain
Treaties of Bangladesh
Treaties of Barbados
Treaties of the Byelorussian Soviet Socialist Republic
Treaties of Belgium
Treaties of Belize
Treaties of the Republic of Dahomey
Treaties of Bhutan
Treaties of Bolivia
Treaties of Bosnia and Herzegovina
Treaties of Botswana
Treaties of the military dictatorship in Brazil
Treaties of Brunei
Treaties of the People's Republic of Bulgaria
Treaties of Burkina Faso
Treaties of Burundi
Treaties of the Kingdom of Cambodia (1953–1970)
Treaties of Cameroon
Treaties of Canada
Treaties of Cape Verde
Treaties of the Central African Republic
Treaties of Chad
Treaties of Chile
Treaties of the People's Republic of China
Treaties of Colombia
Treaties of the Comoros
Treaties of the Republic of the Congo
Treaties of Costa Rica
Treaties of Ivory Coast
Treaties of Croatia
Treaties of Cuba
Treaties of Cyprus
Treaties of the Czech Republic
Treaties of Czechoslovakia
Treaties of North Korea
Treaties of the Democratic Republic of the Congo (1964–1971)
Treaties of Denmark
Treaties of Djibouti
Treaties of Dominica
Treaties of the Dominican Republic
Treaties of Ecuador
Treaties of Egypt
Treaties of El Salvador
Treaties of Equatorial Guinea
Treaties of Eritrea
Treaties of Estonia
Treaties of the Derg
Treaties of Fiji
Treaties of Finland
Treaties of France
Treaties of Gabon
Treaties of the Gambia
Treaties of Georgia (country)
Treaties of West Germany
Treaties of East Germany
Treaties of Ghana
Treaties of the Kingdom of Greece
Treaties of Grenada
Treaties of Guatemala
Treaties of Guinea
Treaties of Guinea-Bissau
Treaties of Guyana
Treaties of Haiti
Treaties of the Holy See
Treaties of Honduras
Treaties of the Hungarian People's Republic
Treaties of Iceland
Treaties of India
Treaties of Indonesia
Treaties of Pahlavi Iran
Treaties of the Iraqi Republic (1958–1968)
Treaties of Ireland
Treaties of Israel
Treaties of Italy
Treaties of Jamaica
Treaties of Japan
Treaties of Jordan
Treaties of Kazakhstan
Treaties of Kenya
Treaties of Kiribati
Treaties of Kuwait
Treaties of Kyrgyzstan
Treaties of the Kingdom of Laos
Treaties of Latvia
Treaties of Lebanon
Treaties of Lesotho
Treaties of Liberia
Treaties of the Libyan Arab Jamahiriya
Treaties of Liechtenstein
Treaties of Lithuania
Treaties of Luxembourg
Treaties of Madagascar
Treaties of Malawi
Treaties of Malaysia
Treaties of the Maldives
Treaties of Mali
Treaties of Malta
Treaties of the Marshall Islands
Treaties of Mauritania
Treaties of Mauritius
Treaties of Mexico
Treaties of the Federated States of Micronesia
Treaties of Monaco
Treaties of the Mongolian People's Republic
Treaties of Montenegro
Treaties of Morocco
Treaties of the People's Republic of Mozambique
Treaties of Myanmar
Treaties of Namibia
Treaties of Nauru
Treaties of Nepal
Treaties of the Netherlands
Treaties of New Zealand
Treaties of Nicaragua
Treaties of Niger
Treaties of Nigeria
Treaties of Norway
Treaties of Oman
Treaties of Pakistan
Treaties of the State of Palestine
Treaties of Panama
Treaties of Papua New Guinea
Treaties of Paraguay
Treaties of Peru
Treaties of the Philippines
Treaties of the Polish People's Republic
Treaties of the Estado Novo (Portugal)
Treaties of Qatar
Treaties of South Korea
Treaties of Moldova
Treaties of the Socialist Republic of Romania
Treaties of the Soviet Union
Treaties of Rwanda
Treaties of Samoa
Treaties of San Marino
Treaties of São Tomé and Príncipe
Treaties of Saudi Arabia
Treaties of Senegal
Treaties of Serbia and Montenegro
Treaties of Seychelles
Treaties of Sierra Leone
Treaties of Singapore
Treaties of Slovakia
Treaties of Slovenia
Treaties of the Somali Republic
Treaties of South Africa
Treaties of Francoist Spain
Treaties of Sri Lanka
Treaties of Saint Kitts and Nevis
Treaties of Saint Lucia
Treaties of Saint Vincent and the Grenadines
Treaties of the Democratic Republic of the Sudan
Treaties of Suriname
Treaties of Eswatini
Treaties of Sweden
Treaties of Switzerland
Treaties of Syria
Treaties of Tajikistan
Treaties of Thailand
Treaties of North Macedonia
Treaties of East Timor
Treaties of Togo
Treaties of Tonga
Treaties of Trinidad and Tobago
Treaties of Tunisia
Treaties of Turkey
Treaties of Turkmenistan
Treaties of Tuvalu
Treaties of Uganda
Treaties of the Ukrainian Soviet Socialist Republic
Treaties of the United Arab Emirates
Treaties of the United Kingdom
Treaties of Tanzania
Treaties of the United States
Treaties of Uruguay
Treaties of Uzbekistan
Treaties of Vanuatu
Treaties of Venezuela
Treaties of Vietnam
Treaties of South Vietnam
Treaties of the Yemen Arab Republic
Treaties of South Yemen
Treaties of Yugoslavia
Treaties of Zambia
Treaties of Zimbabwe
United Nations treaties
1961 in Austria
Treaties extended to Aruba
Treaties extended to the Netherlands Antilles
Treaties extended to the Faroe Islands
Treaties extended to Greenland
Treaties extended to Saint Christopher-Nevis-Anguilla
Treaties extended to Bermuda
Treaties extended to the British Virgin Islands
Treaties extended to the Cayman Islands
Treaties extended to the Falkland Islands
Treaties extended to Gibraltar
Treaties extended to Montserrat
Treaties extended to the Pitcairn Islands
Treaties extended to Saint Helena, Ascension and Tristan da Cunha
Treaties extended to South Georgia and the South Sandwich Islands
Treaties extended to the Turks and Caicos Islands
Treaties extended to British Hong Kong
Treaties extended to Portuguese Macau
Treaties extended to West Berlin